Halvard or Hallvard is a Norwegian given name. Notable people with the name include:

Halvard Angaard (1898–1967), Norwegian sport shooter
Halvard Bjørkvik (born 1924), Norwegian historian
Jens-Halvard Bratz (1920–2005), Norwegian businessman and politician for the Conservative Party
Hallvard Flatland (born 1957), Norwegian television presenter
Halvard Grude Forfang (1914–1987), Norwegian educator
Saint Halvard (1020–1043), Norwegian patron saint of Oslo
Halvard Hanevold (1969–2019), Norwegian biathlete
Halvard Ingebrigtsen (born 1970), Norwegian politician for the Labour Party
Halvard Kausland (born 1945), Norwegian jazz guitarist and civil servant
Halvard Lange (1902–1970), Norwegian diplomat, politician and statesman
Halvard Olsen (1886–1966), Norwegian politician and trade Union leader

See also
St. Halvard Bryggeri
Alvard
Halva
Halvad

Norwegian masculine given names